Colobicus is a genus of cylindrical bark beetles in the family Zopheridae. There are at least four described species in Colobicus.

Species
These four species belong to the genus Colobicus:
 Colobicus hirtus (Rossi, 1790)
 Colobicus indicus Motschulsky, 1863
 Colobicus latiusculus Motschulsky, 1863
 Colobicus parilis Pascoe, 1860

References

Further reading

External links

 

Zopheridae
Articles created by Qbugbot